The Fonseca Prize  of science communication is an annual award created by the University of Santiago de Compostela and the Consortium of Santiago under the auspices of the Program ConCiencia.

The award is named after Alonso III Fonseca, one of the earliest patrons of the university.

Recipients

References

 https://www.abc.es/espana/galicia/abci-convocan-o-premio-fonseca-divulgacion-cientifica-200803010300-1641688831292_noticia.html
 https://www.lavozdegalicia.es/noticia/sociedad/2019/07/20/dia-armstrong-dijo/00031563654757940780309.htm

Academic awards
Spanish awards
Awards established in 2008
Science communication awards